Dyscia conspersaria is a moth of the family Geometridae first described by Michael Denis and Ignaz Schiffermüller in 1755. It is found in south-eastern Central Europe and Asia Minor.

The wingspan is 28–33 mm. Adults are on wing from May to July in one generation per year.

The larvae feed on the leaves of Salvia and Artemisia species. The species overwinters in the pupal stage.

Subspecies
Drysia conspersaria conspersaria
Drysia conspersaria sultanica Wehrli, 1936 (Asia Minor)
Drysia conspersaria turturaria (Boisduval, 1840) (France)

References

External links

Lepiforum e.V.

Moths described in 1775
Aspitatini
Moths of Europe
Moths of Asia
Taxa named by Michael Denis
Taxa named by Ignaz Schiffermüller